Cranial Impalement is the debut studio album by American death metal band Disgorge. It was released by Extremities Records in January 14, 1999 and re-released on August 12, 2008 by Unique Leader Records.

Recording
The album's first four tracks were recorded in 1996 while its last four tracks were recorded in 1995 (and originally appeared on the band's 1995 demo tape).

Track listing
 "Deranged Epidemic" — 3:07
 "Atonement" — 3:17
 "Cognitive Lust of Mutilation" — 2:41
 "Period of Agony" — 3:15
 "Cranial Impalement" — 3:02
 "Penetrate the Unfledged" — 2:57
 "Malodorous Oblation" — 2:42
 "Carnally Decimated" — 2:49
 "Outro" — 0:15

Unique Leader Records albums
1997 albums
Disgorge (American band) albums